The 2005 Women's County One-Day Championship was the 9th cricket Women's County Championship season. It ran from May to August and saw 27 county teams plus Wales compete in a series of divisions. Sussex Women won the County Championship as winners of the top division, their third title in three years.

Competition format 
Teams played matches within a series of divisions with the winners of the top division being crowned County Champions. Matches were played using a one day format with 50 overs per side.

The championship works on a points system with positions within the divisions being based on the total points. Points were awarded as follows:

Win: 12 points. 
Tie:  6 points. 
Loss: Bonus points.
No Result: 11 points.
Abandoned: 11 points.

Up to five batting and five bowling points per side were also available.

Teams
The 2005 Championship was divided into two tiers: the County Championship and the County Challenge Cup. The County Championship consisted of three divisions of four teams, whilst the Challenge Cup consisted of four groups of four teams, on equal standing, with the winners proceeding to a play-off round for promotion to the County Championship.

Teams in the County Championship played each other twice, whilst teams in the Challenge Cup played each other once.

County Championship

County Challenge Cup

County Championship

Division One 

Source: ECB Women's County Championship

Division Two 

Source: ECB Women's County Championship

Division Three 

Source: ECB Women's County Championship

County Challenge Cup

Group 1 

Source: ECB Women's County Championship

Group 2 

Source: ECB Women's County Championship

Group 3 

Source: ECB Women's County Championship

Group 4 

Source: ECB Women's County Championship

Play-off 

Source: ECB Women's County Championship

Statistics

Most runs

Source: CricketArchive

Most wickets

Source: CricketArchive

References

2005
cricket